Žitnik is a Czech surname.  It is common in Slovenia.  Notable people with the surname include:

Boštjan Žitnik (born 1971), Slovenian canoer
Franc Žitnik (born 1941), Yugoslav canoeist
Leon Žitnik, Yugoslav canoeist

Czech-language surnames